Abdelhakim Maazouz (born 22 August 1975) is an Algerian middle-distance runner. He competed in the men's 3000 metres steeplechase at the 2004 Summer Olympics.

References

External links
 

1975 births
Living people
Athletes (track and field) at the 2004 Summer Olympics
Algerian male middle-distance runners
Algerian male steeplechase runners
Olympic athletes of Algeria
Place of birth missing (living people)
21st-century Algerian people